The Dragoman of the Fleet (Ottoman Turkish: , 'Dragoman of the Arsenal') was a senior office in the Ottoman Empire, held by Phanariote Greeks during the 18th and early 19th centuries. As the chief deputy of the Kapudan Pasha, the Dragoman of the Fleet played a leading role in the administration of the various autonomous communities of the islands and coasts of the Aegean Sea that fell within the Eyalet of the Archipelago.

History
The office was established in 1701, in emulation of the Grand Dragoman of the Sublime Porte, which was also reserved for Phanariotes. Indeed, the post of Dragoman of the Fleet often served as a stepping-stone to that of Grand Dragoman. The dragoman (the term means 'interpreter') had to be proficient in the "three languages" of Arabic, Persian, and Turkish that were commonly used in the empire, as well as a number of foreign languages (usually French and Italian), but his role went far beyond a mere interpreter. He was the official intermediary between the Kapudan Pasha, the commander-in-chief of the Ottoman navy who was also governor of the Eyalet of the Archipelago, and the mostly Greek and Christian islanders and inhabitants of the shores of the Aegean Sea during the annual expeditions of the Ottoman fleet for the collection of the taxes, as well as the resolution of administrative problems. The post also entailed responsibilities for shipbuilding and naval operations.

The proceeds of the office were considerable, to the tune of 150,000 , and led to intense competition among the Phanariotes to fill it. This competition involved extensive bribery of Ottoman officials, which was then recuperated from the Christian population by a special levy known as 'contribution to the new dragoman'. As the office often changed hands with great frequency, this became a great burden on the ordinary people. The dragoman also had a staff, which was also paid from impositions on the islands: a deputy (Turkish , Greek ), a correspondence secretary, and a messenger.

Their role in the administration of the Aegean islands was considerable, as they had the right to apportion taxation, as well as supervise the autonomous local administrations by judging cases themselves or appointing appeal judges. They could impose various fines and penalties, up to the death penalty, which however required the consent of the Kapudan Pasha.  Apart from their administrative duties, the dragomans actively promoted education, made donations to churches, codified the customary law of the islands, and intervened in disputes between Orthodox and Catholic islanders.

List of Dragomans of the Fleet

References

Sources

Further reading
 

 
Phanariotes
1701 establishments in the Ottoman Empire
1821 disestablishments in the Ottoman Empire
Ottoman Greece
Dragoman of the Fleet
Government of the Ottoman Empire
Ottoman Navy